King of Prism is a Japanese media franchise produced by Avex Pictures and Tatsunoko Production. The series is a spin-off of the Pretty Rhythm multimedia series and focuses on the male characters introduced in Pretty Rhythm'''s third anime series, Pretty Rhythm: Rainbow Live, aiming for an older female demographic.King of Prism debuted as a film series in 2016, with the first film, King of Prism by Pretty Rhythm releasing in January 9, 2016. It was then followed by King of Prism: Pride the Hero in 2017, King of Prism: Shiny Seven Stars in 2019, and King of Prism All Stars: Prism Show Best 10 in 2020.

Plot

The Pretty Rhythm series focuses on Prism Stars, idols performing figure skating routines through song and dance with special moves known as Prism Jumps. The characters participate in Prism Shows, live performances that are scored based on how charmed the audience is. Currently, there are two styles of Prism Shows for male Prism Stars: academy-style, standardized performances to appeal to women; and street-style, performances that incorporate street dancing and is not officially recognized by the Prism Show Association.

Set 1.5 years after Pretty Rhythm: Rainbow Live, the story follows Shin Ichijo, a new student at Edel Rose Academy inspired by the group Over the Rainbow to train at becoming a Prism Star and participate in Prism Show Tournaments. However, Edel Rose's ex-supervisor Jin Norizuki has established a rival academy, Schwarz Rose, who becomes their main competitor.

Characters

Edel Rose

 is one of the top dance schools specializing in Prism Stars attached to the all-boys high school Kakyoin Academy and Le Celiana Girls Academy. It is run by Hijiri Himuro. Edel Rose's famous alumni includes Koji Mihama, Hiro Hayami, and Kazuki Nishina, who formed the group Over the Rainbow.

Shin is a 15-year-old aspiring Prism Star who idolizes Hiro Hayami. Unbeknownst to him, Rinne had sealed Shine, the male Prism Messenger, inside him, which also gave him the ability to perform in Prism Shows. As a Prism Star, he performs to "Over the Sunshine!" and has the ability to do a Prism Rush, which excites the audience and reminds them of when they first saw Prism Shows. Shin's Prism Jumps are "Over the Sunshine" (King of Prism by Pretty Rhythm), "Shining Splash" (jump 1), "Shin Infinite Hug" (jump 2), and "Rising Sunshine" (jump 3) (Pride the Hero).

Yukinojo is a second-year student with a feminine appearance. He comes from a well-known family of kabuki dancers and is the 7th generation Kunitachiya. As a Prism Star, Yukinojo performs to "Hyakka Ryoran" and his Prism Jumps are "Thousand Year Blossom Splash" (jump 1), "Evening Moon Crimson Love" (jump 2), "Kunitachiya Spiral" (jump 3), "Dream-like State Hellish Love" (jump 4), and "King of 100 Flowers, Renjishi Spinning Flame Dance" (jump 5).

Taiga is a street-style performer from the Aomori countryside who idolizes Kazuki. As a Prism Star, he performs to "Fly in the Sky", and his Prism Jumps are "Burning Splash", "White Fan Zero", "Rising Tiger Hurricane", "Midsummer Night's Nebuta Dream", and "Bouquets for Fortune Boys."

Kakeru is the heir of Juuouin Holdings and has access to his company's projects, such as the Prism System, despite that several employees are against him taking over the company in the future. As a Prism Star, he performs to "Orange Flamingo." He can perform a Cyalume Change, which changes his outfit to a neon rainbow version in the middle of a Prism Show. His Prism Jumps are "Kakerunomics Fund" and "One Night Heaven."

Leo idolizes Yukinojo and designs Edel Rose's performance costumes. He hopes to break out of his feminine image. As a Prism Star, he performs to "Twinkle Twinkle." He can perform a Prism Change, which changes his outfit in the middle of a Prism Show. His Prism Jumps are "Metamorphosis of Love and Mystery" and "Lion Heart Flower."

Minato is from a large family and cooks for Edel Rose students, often incorporating foods they don't like. As a Prism Star, he performs to "Sailing Away." His Prism Jumps are Minato's Chef's Choice a la Carte (jump 1) and Grand Homecoming Harbor (jump 2).

Yu is Ito's younger brother who first appeared as a minor character in Pretty Rhythm: Rainbow Live. He enrolls as a student in Edel Rose to become a Prism Star and aspires to become a songwriter like Koji. He is a fan of Bell, but dislikes Hiro. He insists on being called by his nickname, Zeus. As a Prism Star, he performs to "Shiny Stellar." He can perform a Prism Live, which allows him to play instruments in the middle of a Prism Show. His Prism Jump is "I am Zeus."

Ryo is Edel Rose's janitor and the freshmen's coach. He used to be a Prism Star until Jin tarnished his image by plotting and publicizing an underage sex and smoking scandal.

Sakyo is a student from Edel Rose first appearing in the mobile game King of Prism: Prism Rush! Live in November 2018. He is Ukyo's twin brother.

Ukyo is a student from Edel Rose first appearing in the mobile game King of Prism: Prism Rush! Live in November 2018. He is Sakyo's twin brother.

Revontulet is a student from Edel Rose first appearing in the mobile game King of Prism: Prism Rush! Live. He is from Finland.

Schwarz Rose

 is a school for Prism Stars led by Jin Norizuki, who uses Spartan training to discipline students and has a large influence on media.

Louis is Schwarz Rose's star pupil and Jin's favorite student, who claims to have crossed a millennia to see Shin. He is later revealed to be version 3.01 of the Rinne-type messenger from the Prism World, who assumed the form of a boy after the Shine-type messenger went faulty. Having watched over Shin for a long time, he falls in love with him, but he remains loyal to Jin, as being in Schwarz Rose is the only way he can accomplish his mission. As a Prism Star, he performs to "Pride", "Lunatic Destiny", and "I Know Shangri-La." Louis' Prism Jumps are "Starlight Kiss", "Absolute Idol: I Love You", "100% Pure Pure Arrow", "Star Splash", "Bloom-Bloom-Blooming Love Flowers", "Whispering Lunamystic Heaven", "Aurora Rising", "Fluttering Rainbow Tail", "Infinite Hug Eternal", "Can't Stop Fall in Heaven," and "Dawn's Love Again."

Alexander, sometimes called  for short, specializes in street-style performances and views Kazuki as his rival. As a Prism Star, he performs to "EZ Do Dance." Alec's Prism Jumps are "666 Muscle Bomb", "Iron Six-Pack Core Wonder" and "Rolling Thunderstorm."

He was formerly the leader of the Prism Star unit The Shuffle before being assigned a solo performer. He was introduced in Pride the Hero and Tomokazu Sugita was specifically chosen to voice him due to him promoting King of Prism by Pretty Rhythm on his social media.

Ace is Joji's ghost singer whose voice was featured in Pride the Hero before being introduced in Shiny Seven Stars as a new character.

Prism World

Shine is a male-type Prism Messenger from the Prism World who decides to join Prism Show tournaments under the belief that male Prism Stars are too selfish to spread the Prism Sparkle. Because performing in tournaments will prevent the Prism Sparkle from spreading, the Shine program is deemed defective and Rinne kills him under orders from the Prism World, sealing him inside Shin. As a Prism Star, he performs to the song "Platonic Sword" and is able to perform a Prism Axel, allowing him to perform seven Prism Jumps simultaneously.

Prism Gods

The seven gods of the Prism World developed the Rinne/Shine program to lead Prism Stars. The gods consist of God I: M-m.G (Type M), God II: H.B. (Type M), God III: D.A. (Type F), God IV: C.S. (Type F), God V: N.P. (Type M), God VI: P.M. (Type M), and God VII: M.F. (Type F).

Production

Hiroko Nishi and Takeshi Yoda had wanted to develop a late-night 13-episode television series that would focus on Over the Rainbow, the male characters of Pretty Rhythm: Rainbow Live, but their original plan was rejected. When it was reworked into a film, it was rejected again, and the staff were told that if they were able to provide evidence that the project would work out, then it would be approved. When the full version of Over the Rainbow's theme song, "Athletic Core", received positive feedback. a character song album centered on them was produced. In 2015, Over the Rainbow appeared in the movie Gekijō-ban PriPara: Minna Atsumare! Prism Tours if the audience chose to view route 4, which ended with a teaser for their comeback. The film was financially successful, with fans attending the cheer screenings multiple times with glowsticks. After executives at Avex Pictures assessed the popularity of cheer screenings, they then approved the King of Prism by Pretty Rhythm film project.

Discography

Studio albums

Singles

As featured artist

Media

Film

After teasing Over the Rainbow's comeback at several Pretty Rhythm and PriPara events, King of Prism by Pretty Rhythm was announced at an Edel Rose event in 2015. The film was directed by Masakazu Hishida, who had previously directed various episodes of Pretty Rhythm, while Pretty Rhythm: Aurora Dream scriptwriter Jou Aoba was in charge of the script. Yoshihiro Otobe, who previously handled the CG direction in Pretty Rhythm Rainbow Live was in charge of the CG direction for the film, and Mai Matsuura was in charge of character designs. The film was released in Japan on January 9, 2016, grossing  at the Japanese box office in two months. The Los Angeles Film Festival screened the film on September 16, 2017.

A second film titled King of Prism: Pride the Hero was announced in 2016 and was released in theaters on June 10, 2017. The film ranked #7 nationwide on its opening weekend and grossed  within the first four days of release, grossing more than .King of Prism: Shiny Seven Stars, a television anime series and film project, was announced in 2018 as a sequel to the first two films. The theatrical version consisting of four feature compilation films, with three episodes condensed in each, were given limited cheer screenings from March to May 2019. The first film, King of Prism: Shiny Seven Stars I: Prologue × Yukinojo × Taiga, opened on March 2, 2019. The second film, King of Prism: Shiny Seven Stars II: Kakeru × Joji × Minato, opened on March 23, 2019. The third film, King of Prism: Shiny Seven Stars III: Leo × Yu × Alec, opened on April 13, 2019. The final film, King of Prism: Shiny Seven Stars IV: Louis × Shin × Unknown, opened on May 4, 2019. King of Prism: Shiny Seven Stars IV: Louis × Shin × Unknown, opened at #1 on opening day and #9 on opening weekend. The television version aired weekly on TV Tokyo at 1:35 AM beginning April 8, 2019, with all four films split into 12 episodes. Crunchyroll licensed the show for English distribution. The opening theme song is "Shiny Seven Stars!" The ending theme song for the theatrical version is "366 Love Diary", while the television version features cover versions of TRF's most popular songs from each character.

A compilation film titled King of Prism All Stars: Prism Show Best 10 was announced in 2019 and was released in theatres on January 10, 2020. The anime film sold 26,000 tickets and earned 45 million in its first four days.

Stage play

A stage play adaptation summarizing both King of Prism by Pretty Rhythm and King of Prism: Pride the Hero, titled King of Prism: Over the Sunshine!, ran at Umeda Arts Theater Drama City in Osaka from November 2 to 5, 2017 and AiiA 2.5 Theater Tokyo from November 8 to 12, 2017. The play is directed by Masanari Ujikawa. Jou Aoba and Rei Ishizuka, who had worked on the original animated film as the scriptwriter and music composer respectively, returned to work on the play. The cast consists of Shohei Hashimoto as Shin, Koji Kominami as Kouji, Taishi Sugie as Hiro, Takuto Omi as Kazuki, Shojiro Yokoi as Yukinojo, Ryoki Nagae as Taiga, Yoshiki Murakami as Kakeru, Yuzuki Hoshimoto as Leo, Ryota Hirono as Yu, Taiki Naito as Louis, Spi as Alexander, and Yamato Furuya as Joji. Masashi Igarashi reprised his role as Minato from the film.

Manga

A manga adaptation of King of Prism by Pretty Rhythm, titled King of Prism by Pretty Rhythm Party Time, was drawn by Sumika Sumio and serialized in Monthly GFantasy. The manga ended in the February 2018 issue, released on January 18, 2018.

Game

A gacha game for smart phones titled King of Prism: Prism Rush! Live was released on August 4, 2017. The events in the game explore plot details in the King of Prism by Pretty Rhythm and King of Prism: Pride the Hero, as well as connecting them to King of Prism: Shiny Seven Stars with events titled "Road to Shiny Seven Stars." On August 12, 2020, Avex announced the game would end services on October 29, 2020.

Short stories

From January to December 2018, a series of short stories called Young of Prism: Boku, Umareta! by King of Prism were published monthly on Pash! Plus, the online website of the magazine Pash! Each story was released monthly, focusing on one of the main Prism Star characters when they were babies.

Other media

The characters of King of Prism have made crossover appearances in other franchises and games. Taiga, Kakeru, and Alexander appeared in a collaboration rap battle with Buster Bros!!! from Hypnosis Mic: Division Rap Battle. Shin, Hiro, Taiga, Kakeru, and Alexander appeared in Ensemble Stars! The characters will also be appearing in DREAM!ing. King of Prism'' has also collaborated with the skincare brand Bioré UV and appeared on promotional packaging.

References

External links
  
 Young of Prism: Boku, Umareta! by King of Prism official website 
 Juuouin Holdings official website 

Pretty Rhythm
Syn Sophia games
Takara Tomy franchises
Tatsunoko Production
TV Tokyo original programming
Animated musical groups
Japanese idol video games
Japanese idols in anime and manga
Figure skating in anime and manga
Shōnen manga